Thomas Moore (1779–1852) was an Irish poet, songwriter, singer, novelist, and historian.

Thomas, Tom, Tomm or Tommy Moore may also refer to:

Writers
 Thomas Moore (spiritual writer) (born 1940), American author of Care of the Soul and other popular spiritual books
 Thomas Sturge Moore (1870–1944), English poet, author and artist

Entertainment
 Thomas W. Moore (1918–2007), American television executive at ABC
 Tom Moore (actor) (1883–1955), silent film actor
 Tom Moore (cartoonist) (1928–2015), best known for the "Archie" comic books series
 Tom Moore (director) (born 1943), American director of night, Mother and multiple television shows
 Tomm Moore (born 1977), Irish Oscar-nominated animator, cartoonist and movie director
 Tommy Moore (comedian) (born 1950), American comedian, clown, and motivational speaker
 Tommy Moore (musician) (1931–1981), drummer for The Silver Beetles (later The Beatles) in 1960
 Ennio Girolami (1935–2013), sometimes credited as Thomas Moore, Italian actor

Politics
 Sir Thomas de la Moore or More (died after 1347), English knight and member of parliament
 Sir Thomas Moore, 1st Baronet (1886–1971), Conservative Member of Parliament for Ayr 1925–1964
 Thomas Moore (Australian politician) (1881–1961), Australian politician
 Thomas Moore (South Carolina congressman) (1759–1822), representative from South Carolina 1799–1801
 Thomas Moore (Roundhead) (1618–1695), English politician who sat in the House of Commons variously between 1640 and 1660
 Thomas Fitzgibbon Moore, constable and politician in Newfoundland
 Thomas Love Moore (died 1862), American congressman
 Thomas Overton Moore (1804–1876), U.S. and subsequently Confederate governor of Louisiana
 Thomas Patrick Moore (1797–1853), U.S. Representative from Kentucky
 Tom Moore (politician) (born 1952), American politician in the Iowa House of Representatives
 Tom Moore (trade unionist) (1878–1943), Canadian carpenter and trade unionist from Ontario
 Tom Moore Jr. (1918–2017), Democratic member of the Texas House of Representatives, 1967–1973
 Tommy Moore (politician) (born 1950),  South Carolina businessman and former state politician

Sports

Baseball and cricket
 Tommy Moore (baseball) (1948–2017), Major League Baseball pitcher
 Thomas Moore (English cricketer) (born 1992), English cricketer
 Thomas Moore (New Zealand cricketer) (1844–1935), New Zealand cricketer

Football
 Tom Moore (footballer) (born 1936), English goalkeeper, Darlington
 Tommy Moore (footballer) (1877–?), English goalkeeper, Millwall, West Ham
 Thomas Moore (footballer) (1864–?), Scottish footballer Arbroath, Stoke
 Thomas Patrick Moore (footballer) (1872–1934), Argentine footballer
 Tom Moore (American football coach, born 1938), National Football League coach
 Tom Moore (American football coach, born 1945), college football coach
 Tom Moore (running back) (born 1938), former NFL running back

Other sports
 Tom Moore (track) (1914–2002), track athlete and long time meet director of the Modesto Relays
 Tom Moore (basketball) (born 1965), basketball coach at Quinnipiac University
 Tommy Moore (golfer) (1962–1998), American professional golfer
 Tommy Moore (hurler) (1890–1973), Irish hurler
 Thomas "Tommy" Moore, English professional wrestler, billed as Jack Dempsey (1920–2007)

Other
 T. B. Moore (Thomas Bather Moore, 1850–1919), pioneer of Tasmania
 Thomas Moore (admiral) (born 1959), officer in the United States Navy
 Thomas Moore (Australian settler) (1762–1840), early settler to Australia, co-founder of Moore Theological College
 Thomas Moore (botanist) (1821–1887), British botanist
 Thomas Moore (British Army Paymaster of the Forces Abroad) (c. 1669–1735)
 Thomas Moore (priest) (born 1938), Dean of Clogher, 1995–2004
 Thomas Hill Moore, commissioner of the U.S. Consumer Product Safety Commission
 Thomas Verner Moore (church minister) (1818–1871), Reformed theologian and Presbyterian minister
 Thomas Verner Moore (1877–1969), American psychologist, psychiatrist and monk
 Captain Tom Moore (1920–2021), British soldier and NHS COVID-19 fundraiser

See also 
 Thomas More (disambiguation)